The Tempest or The Enchanted Isle is an opera in three acts by composer John Christopher Smith. The work's English language libretto by David Garrick is based on the 1611 play of the same name by William Shakespeare. The opera premiered on 11 February 1756 in London at the Theatre Royal, Drury Lane.

Roles

References

Operas
English-language operas
1756 operas
Operas based on The Tempest